The 2017 Renfrewshire Council election took place on 4 May 2017 to elect members of Renfrewshire Council. The election was first to use the twelve wards created as a result of the 2015-16 Boundary Commission review, with each ward electing three or four Councillors using the single transferable vote system, a form of proportional representation, with 43 Councillors being elected, a net increase of 3 members compared to the 2012 Council.

Election result

Note: "Votes" are the first preference votes. The net gain/loss and percentage changes relate to the result of the previous Scottish local elections on 3 May 2007. This may differ from other published sources showing gain/loss relative to seats held at dissolution of Scotland's councils.

Ward results

Renfrew North and Braehead
2012: 2xLab; 1xSNP
2017: 2xSNP; 1xLab; 1xCon
2012-2017 Change: 1 additional seat compared to 2012. SNP gain one seat from Labour. Conservative gain extra seat.

Renfrew South and Gallowhill
2012: 2xLab; 1xSNP
2017: 2xSNP; 1xLab
2012-2017 Change: SNP gain one seat from Labour

Paisley Northeast and Ralston
2012: 2xLab; 2xSNP
2017: 1xCon; 1xLab; 1xSNP
2012-2017 Change (vs Paisley East and Ralston): 1 less seat compared to 2012. Conservative gain one seat from Labour. SNP lose additional seat.

Paisley Northwest
2012: 2xLab; 2xSNP
2017: 2xSNP; 1xLab; 1xCon
2012-2017 Change: Conservative gain one seat from Labour

Paisley East and Central
2017: 2xSNP; 1xLab
New ward

Paisley Southeast
2012: 2xLab; 1xSNP; 1xIndependent
2017: 1xLab; 1xSNP; 1xIndependent
2012-2017 Change (vs Paisley South): 1 less seat compared to 2012. Labour lose seat.

Paisley Southwest
2012: 2xLab; 1xSNP; 1xLib Dem
2017: 2xSNP; 1xLab; 1xLib Dem
2012-2017 Change: SNP gain one seat from Labour

Johnstone South and Elderslie
2012: 3xLab; 1xSNP
2017: 2xSNP; 1xLab; 1xCon
2012-2017 Change: SNP & Conservative each gain one seat from Labour.

Johnstone North, Kilbarchan, Howwood and Lochwinnoch
2012: 2xLab; 1xSNP
2017: 1xLab; 1xSNP; 1xCon; 1xIndependent
2012-2017 Change: 1 extra seat compared to 2012. Labour lose one seat to Conservative. Independent gain extra seat.

Houston, Crosslee and Linwood
2012: 2xLab; 2xSNP
2017: 2xLab; 1xSNP; 1xCon
2012-2017 Change: Conservative gain one seat from SNP.

Bishopton, Bridge of Weir and Langbank
2012: 1xLab; 1xCon; 1xSNP
2017: 1xCon; 1xSNP; 1xLab
2012-2017 Change: No change

Erskine and Inchinnan
2012: 2xLab; 2xSNP
2017: 2xSNP; 1xLab; 1xCon 
2012-2017 Change: Conservative gain one seat from Labour

Changes since Election
† In August 2018, Houston, Crosslee and Linwood Labour Cllr Jim Sheridan was suspended from the party following the discovery of anti-Semitic posts on Facebook. He was reinstated following an investigation in January 2019. In July 2021 he was suspended again. In March 2022 he resigned from the Labour party

†† Paisley Southeast Cllr Paul Mack was disqualified from office by the Standards Commission for Scotland, with effect from 1 October 2020. A by-election was due to be held on the 14th of December 2021, however Paul Mack appealed the decision to the Court of Session. On 11 March 2022, the Court of Session ruled to the effect that Cllr Mack's disqualification was reduced to ten months, backdated to May 2021.

††† On 22 October 2020 Johnstone North, Kilbarchan, Howwood and Lochwinnoch Cllr Andy Doig joined the Scotia Future party.

†††† Bishopton, Bridge of Weir and Langbank SNP Cllr Natalie Don was elected as a MSP for Renfrewshire North and West in the 2021 Scottish Parliament election.

††††† In December 2021 Councillors Dowling, Davidson, McCulloch and Montgomery were suspended from the Labour group, but this was overturned on 30 December.

†††††† In March 2022 Councillor Jim Harte was suspended from the Labour group.

References 

2017
2017 Scottish local elections